Coahoma is a town in Coahoma County, Mississippi, United States. Per the 2020 census, the population was 229.

History
Coahoma was founded in the 1880s, and named for its location within Coahoma County.

Coahoma was a stop on the Mississippi Delta Railroad, completed in 1884.

Geography

Demographics

2020 census

Note: the US Census treats Hispanic/Latino as an ethnic category. This table excludes Latinos from the racial categories and assigns them to a separate category. Hispanics/Latinos can be of any race.

2010 Census
As of the 2010 United States Census, there were 377 people living in the town. 99.2% were African American and 0.8% White.

As of the census of 2000, there were 325 people, 110 households, and 74 families living in the town. The population density was 3,663.5 people per square mile (1,394.3/km2). There were 123 housing units at an average density of 1,386.5 per square mile (527.7/km2). The racial makeup of the town was 98.2% African American, 1.5% White and 0.3% from two or more races.

There were 110 households, out of which 40.9% had children under the age of 18 living with them, 14.5% were married couples living together, 45.5% had a female householder with no husband present, and 32.7% were non-families. 29.1% of all households were made up of individuals, and 14.5% had someone living alone who was 65 years of age or older. The average household size was 2.95 and the average family size was 3.65.

In the town, the population was spread out, with 41.8% under the age of 18, 9.2% from 18 to 24, 28.3% from 25 to 44, 10.8% from 45 to 64, and 9.8% who were 65 years of age or older. The median age was 23 years. For every 100 females, there were 92.9 males. For every 100 females age 18 and over, there were 77.5 males.

The median income for a household in the town was $11,882, and the median income for a family was $12,327. Males had a median income of $17,625 versus $13,250 for females. The per capita income for the town was $4,840. About 55.6% of families and 55.3% of the population were below the poverty line, including 63.9% of those under age 18 and 73.5% of those age 65 or over.

Education
The town is served by the Coahoma County School District. Residents are served by Coahoma County Junior-Senior High School.

Notable people
 Charles Hardy Carr, U.S. federal judge
 James Carr, musician
 Charles C. Cordill, Louisiana state senator from Tensas Parish from 1884 to 1916
 Frank Montgomery Hull (1901-1982), Entomologist
 Herb McMath, professional football player

References

Towns in Coahoma County, Mississippi
Towns in Mississippi
Mississippi placenames of Native American origin